Charles Henry Wilton (1761—1832) was an English violinist, singer, composer and teacher of violin and piano.

Biography
Wilton was born in Gloucester (England) on 15 June 1761 and died on  15 August 1832 in Southport (Lancashire, England). A brief account of his life appears in recent editions of The New Grove Dictionary of Music and Musicians 
and there is also a brief mention in the  Biographical Dictionary of Actors, Actresses, Musicians, Dancers, Managers and Other Stage Personnel in London, 1660—1800.

Gloucester is one home of the Three Choirs Festival and, as a young man, Wilton studied the violin under Felice Giardini, the leader of the festival orchestra. During the late 1770s their names appear together on handbills for chamber recitals in London, where Giardini was resident at that time. Wilton continued his studies in  Italy and on his return in 1784 he succeeded Giardini as leader of the orchestra for the Three Choirs Festival. His place of residence is unknown but he was  active in London at this time—he is recorded as the leader of the orchestra for  a performance of the oratorio Judith at the Haymarket theatre, London, on  13 March 1785. At some stage he established his home in the north-west of England and for many years he was in demand as leader of orchestras in Liverpool, Manchester and York although he resided in Brentford for a period around 1805. Lysons claims that by 1812 he had given up the violin and had confined himself to teaching piano in the Liverpool area.

Compositions
The British Library holds a number of scores 
including

There are many other song settings.

Recordings

Three of the six duets of Opus 2 have been recorded (as trios) with an additional bass continuo. They are  coupled with a septet by Hummel on a disc available from Forgotten records.

A setting of Psalm 12 is included in a collection of psalm settings by the Choir of King's College Cambridge.

One of the Piano Sonatas is included (with incorrect dates) as the first piece in the series Classics to Moderns by Dénes Ágay. A free score is available. This popular piece has many YouTube recordings, some with interesting variations.

References

1761 births
1832 deaths
English classical violinists
British male violinists
19th-century British male singers
18th-century British composers
18th-century British male musicians
19th-century British composers
Musicians from Gloucestershire
People from Gloucester
Male classical violinists